The 1988 Virginia Slims of Chicago was a women's tennis tournament played on indoor carpet courts at the UIC Pavilion in Chicago, Illinois in the United States and was part of the Category 4 tier of the 1988 WTA Tour. It was the 17th edition of the tournament and was held from November 7 through November 13, 1988. First-seeded Martina Navratilova won the singles title, her third consecutive and ninth in total at the event, and earned $50,000 first-prize money.

Finals

Singles

 Martina Navratilova defeated  Chris Evert 6–2, 6–2
 It was Navratilova's 9th singles title of the year and the 138th of her career.

Doubles

 Lori McNeil /  Betsy Nagelsen defeated  Larisa Savchenko /  Natasha Zvereva 6–4, 3–6, 6–4
 It was McNeil's 8th title of the year and the 18th of her career. It was Nagelsen's 2nd title of the year and the 18th of her career.

See also
 Evert–Navratilova rivalry

References

External links
 International Tennis Federation (ITF) tournament edition details
 Tournament draws

Virginia Slims of Chicago
Ameritech Cup
1988 in sports in Illinois
November 1988 sports events in the United States
Virgin